is a fossil-fuel power station  operated by Kansai Electric in the city of Gobō, Wakayama, Japan. It located on the Pacific coast.

History
The Gobō Thermal Power Station was the first to be built in Japan on an artificial island in the Pacific Ocean. It came on line in September 1984 with Unit 1, followed by Unit 2 in November 1984, and Unit 3 in March 1985. The initial installed capacity was 1800 MW; however, since its fuel sources are heavy oil or crude oil, operations were severely impacted by rising crude oil prices and its operational rate has been low. Operations on Unit 2 were suspended in April 2019 due to low demand and high costs.

Plant details

See also 

 List of fuel oil power stations
 List of power stations in Japan

References

External links
Official home page
Principal Thermal Power Plants (1,500MW or greater) (Federation of Electric Power Companies of Japan

Oil-fired power stations in Japan
Gobō, Wakayama
1984 establishments in Japan
Energy infrastructure completed in 1984
Buildings and structures in Wakayama Prefecture